Tracy Lynn Olivera is an American actress.  It has been said that her "versatility as an actress makes her a DC theatre force of nature."  As a jazz singer, she frequently performs with pianist Lenny Williams and her solo cd is entitled Because.

She is married to Evan Casey and together they have a son, Oscar Linus.  She met Casey while performing in Allegro at the Signature Theatre.  She studied at The Catholic University of America.

References

American musical theatre actresses
Living people
American stage actresses
21st-century American actresses
20th-century American actresses
American women singers
Catholic University of America alumni
Year of birth missing (living people)